Frida Maria Johansson Metso (born 5 September 1984 in Gothenburg) is a Swedish politician and was chairperson of the Liberal Youth of Sweden from 2006 to 2009. She lives in Uppsala, where she was studying psychology at Uppsala University until she took a sabbatical from her studies on being elected. She joined LUF at the age of 14 and has previously been chairperson of the Liberal Refugee Fund and 2nd vice chairperson of the Liberal Youth of Sweden. She belongs to the social liberal left wing of the Liberal People's Party, also speaking in favor of Sweden as an alcoholic beverage control state. On foreign policy, however, she favours a somewhat more harsh stance, having openly criticized the authoritarian regimes of Myanmar, the People's Republic of China, Cuba and Belarus, citing Fidel Castro's 2008 relinquishing of power as the "last nail in [Castro's] coffin". She openly spoke in favour of a boycott of the 2008 Summer Olympics in Beijing, citing the numerous human rights abuses of the Chinese government as a just cause.

In the election of 2006, she was elected a substitute in Uppsala County Council.

References

External links
Frida Johansson Metso's blog 

1984 births
Living people
People from Gothenburg
Liberals (Sweden) politicians
Swedish bloggers
Swedish women bloggers
Local politicians in Sweden
21st-century Swedish women politicians